The 79th running of the Tour of Flanders cycling race in Belgium was held on Sunday 2 April 1995. It was the second leg of the 1995 UCI Road World Cup. Belgian Johan Museeuw won his second victory in the monument classic. The race started in Sint-Niklaas and finished in Meerbeke (Ninove).

Race summary
Pre-race favourite Johan Museeuw punctured on the Paddestraat, but returned before the race finale. Museeuw attacked on the Berendries climb, 33 km before the finish, in pursuit of Fabio Baldato and the two worked together until the Muur van Geraardsbergen. Museeuw distanced Baldato on the steep upper slopes of the Muur and powered on to the finish, taking his second win. Andrei Tchmil caught Baldato in the final kilometers, but was beaten by the Italian in the sprint for second place.

Climbs
There were fifteen categorized climbs:

Results

External links
 Recap of the race (Flemish television)

References

Tour of Flanders
Tour of Flanders
Tour of Flanders
Tour of Flanders
Tour Of Flanders